The de Choiseul (de Reuss) Palace (Lithuanian: Šuazelių (de Reusų) rūmai; Polish: pałac de Choiseulów (de Reussów)) is a building in Simonas Daukantas square, Vilnius Old Town, Lithuania. Currently it is used as dwellings and "Copy1" company subsidiary.

History 
In the 16th century, the building was owned by Grand Duchy of Lithuania chamberlain Michał Pac. In 1798, French exile Choiseul-Gouffier, Director of the Imperial Academy of Arts, reconstructed the palace with Marcin Knackfus as the architect. In the 19th century, Earl De Reuss (French: Raes) purchased the palace, later the Platers bought the palace.

References 

Palaces in Vilnius